The Acrolepiidae are a family of moths known as false diamondback moths. In modern classifications, they are often treated as a subfamily (Acrolepiinae) of the family Glyphipterigidae.

Caterpillars are typically spotted and 10 to 12 mm in length.  Adults have a wingspan between 16 and 18 mm and are generally nocturnal.

Species

Some representative species are:

Acrolepia aiea, Swezey 1933
Acrolepia alliella, Sato 1979
Acrolepia autumnitella, Curtis 1838
Acrolepia nothocestri, Busck 1914
Acrolepiopsis assectella, Zeller, 1839
Acrolepiopsis betulella, Curtis 1838
Acrolepiopsis incertella, Chambers 1872
Acrolepiopsis marcidella, Curtis 1850
Acrolepiopsis sapporensis, Matsumura 1931
Acrolepiopsis tauricella, Staudinger 1870
Acrolepiopsis vesperella, Zeller 1850
Digitivalva arnicella, Heyden 1863
Digitivalva eglanteriella, Mann 1855
Digitivalva granitella, Treitschke 1833
Digitivalva occidentella, Klimesch 1956
Digitivalva pulicariae, Klimesch 1956
Digitivalva reticulella, Hübner 1796

References
Gaedike R. (1969). Contribution for the knowledge of the Acrolepiidae Fauna of the Balkan Peninsula
Carter, D. (1984). Pest Lepidoptera of Europe. Dr. W. Junk Publishers, Boston.

External links
Microleps U.S.A.(Nearctic)
Naturhistoriska riksmuseet Imago, genitalia images

 
Taxa named by Hermann von Heinemann